Pastria grinpela is a butterfly of the family Hesperiidae. It is widespread throughout the Central Cordillera in Papua New Guinea as well as western New Guinea.

External links
Notes on some skippers of the Taractrocera-group (Lepidoptera: Hesperiidae: Hesperiinae) from New Guinea

Taractrocerini
Butterflies described in 1986